This is a list of members of the Western Australian Legislative Assembly from 1986 to 1989:

Notes
 On 4 April 1986, the Labor member for Cockburn, Clive Hughes, died. Labor candidate Norm Marlborough won the resulting by-election on 7 June 1986.
 On 16 April 1986, the Labor member for Victoria Park, Ron Davies, resigned to take up the role of Agent-General for Western Australia in London. Labor candidate Dr Geoff Gallop won the resulting by-election on 7 June 1986.
 On 14 March 1987, the National member for Narrogin, Cambell Nalder, died. National candidate Bob Wiese won the resulting by-election on 9 May 1987.
 On 18 March 1987, the Labor member for Morley-Swan, Hon Arthur Tonkin, resigned. Labor candidate Frank Donovan won the resulting by-election on 9 May 1987.
 On 18 March 1987, the Labor member for Perth, Terry Burke, resigned. Labor candidate Dr Ian Alexander won the resulting by-election on 9 May 1987.
 On 3 September 1987, the Liberal member for Gascoyne, Ian Laurance, resigned. Liberal candidate Dudley Maslen won the resulting by-election on 24 October 1987.
 On 3 September 1987, the Liberal member for Darling Range, George Spriggs, resigned. Liberal candidate Bob Greig won the resulting by-election on 24 October 1987.
 On 17 February 1988, the Labor member for Balga and Premier, Brian Burke, resigned. Labor candidate Ted Cunningham won the resulting by-election on 19 March 1988.
 On 17 February 1988, the Labor member for Ascot and Deputy Premier, Mal Bryce, resigned. Labor candidate Eric Ripper won the resulting by-election on 19 March 1988.
 On 25 February 1988, the Liberal member for Dale, former Court government minister Cyril Rushton, resigned. Liberal candidate Fred Tubby won the resulting by-election on 7 May 1988.

Members of Western Australian parliaments by term